Alle zusammen – jeder für sich (All Together - Every Man for Himself) was a German television soap opera series which aired on RTL II between 25 November 1996 and 30 October 1997. 230 episodes were produced by Grundy UFA.

See also
List of German television series

External links
 

German television soap operas
1996 German television series debuts
1997 German television series endings
RTL (German TV channel) original programming
German-language television shows